Westwell may refer to:

Places
Westwell, Kent
Westwell, Oxfordshire

People with the surname
George Westwell (1931–2001), Archdeacon of Malta
Simon Westwell (born 1961), English footballer